Jungar may refer to:
Dzungar people, sometimes spelled "Jungar" or "Jüün Ghar", the collective identity of several Oirat tribes
Jungar, Nepal, Village Development Committee in Nepal
Jungar Banner, county of Inner Mongolia, China